Andro Švrljuga (born 24 October 1985) is a Croatian football midfielder who plays for HNK Orijent 1919 .

Club career
Švrljuga previously played for Pomorac Kostrena, Istra 1961, Rijeka and Žalgiris . In 2017 and 2018 Švrljuga became Lithuania A Lyga champion with FK Sūduva.

Honours
Sūduva
 A Lyga: 2019
 Lithuanian Football Cup: 2019

Individual
A Lyga Team of the Year: 2018

References

External links
 

1985 births
Living people
Footballers from Rijeka
Association football fullbacks
Croatian footballers
NK Pomorac 1921 players
NK Istra 1961 players
HNK Rijeka players
FK Žalgiris players
FK Sūduva Marijampolė players
HNK Orijent players
Croatian Football League players
A Lyga players
First Football League (Croatia) players
Croatian expatriate footballers
Expatriate footballers in Lithuania
Croatian expatriate sportspeople in Lithuania